William Portman was an Irish Anglican clergyman.

Portman was a Prebendary of Achonry and Archdeacon of Elphin from 1661 until 1665.

References 

Irish Anglicans
Archdeacons of Elphin